Unni is a 1989 Indian feature film directed by G. Aravindan. William Rothman (Bill Rothman) and his wife, Kitty Morgan, wrote and co-produced (with the National Film Development Corporation of India) the film. The film was inspired by the experiences of students in the International Honours Programme on Film, Television and Social Change.

Plot summary
The film is about a few American students studying in Kerala. Narrated by one of the students named Tara, the plot follows her relationship with a local boy named Unni.

Cast
 Tara Johannessen as Tara
 Gijie Abraham as Unni
 Sethu as Sethu
 Chris Bonnell as Carol
 Vivian Colodro as Maggie
 Jorden Freid as Jorden

References

External links
 
 Bill Rothman's video on G. Aravindan
 
 

1989 films
English-language Indian films
1980s Malayalam-language films
Films directed by G. Aravindan